The Central Kansas Railway (CKR)  was a short-line railroad operating  of trackage in the U.S. state of Kansas and west to Scott City, Kansas. All trackage was former Atchison, Topeka & Santa Fe Railway branchlines in Kansas and northern Oklahoma. The Kansas Southwestern Railway, a sister company which operated former Missouri Pacific Railroad branchlines in Kansas, was merged into the CKR in 2000. Owned by Omnitrax, CKR's main business was from the Kansas wheat harvests, as well as other traffic.

Watco purchased all of the CKR's lines on May 31, 2001 and formed the Kansas & Oklahoma Railroad.

References

External links

Defunct Kansas railroads
Former regional railroads in the United States
OmniTRAX
Spin-offs of the Atchison, Topeka and Santa Fe Railway
Defunct Colorado railroads